Athiwat Paeng-nuea (born 20 October 2002) is a Paralympian athlete from Thailand competing in category T54 sprint events. He represented Thailand at the 2020 Summer Paralympics which he won a gold medal in the 100 metres T54 event and another silver medal in the 400 metres event.

Biography
Athiwat competed for Thailand in the Tokyo Paralympics. On 29 August 2021, he set the new Paralympic record in the 400 metres event in the heat round and got through to won his first silver medal at the Paralympics Games. Then, he won his first gold medal in the 100 metres T54 event.

References

2002 births
Living people
Athiwat Paeng-nuea
Male wheelchair racers
Athiwat Paeng-nuea
Paralympic wheelchair racers
Athiwat Paeng-nuea
Paralympic medalists in athletics (track and field)
Medalists at the 2020 Summer Paralympics
Athletes (track and field) at the 2020 Summer Paralympics
Athiwat Paeng-nuea